Melissa is a 1964 British thriller television series which originally aired in six parts on BBC 2 in 1964. It was shown under the umbrella title Francis Durbridge Presents, and was one of a number of serials written by Francis Durbridge during the period.

Cast
 Tony Britton as  Guy Foster (6 episodes)
 Helen Christie as Paula Hepburn (6 episodes)
 Brian McDermott as Don Page (6 episodes)
 Kerry Jordan as Felix Hepburn (5 episodes)
 Norman Scace as Dr. Norman Swanley (5 episodes)
 Elizabeth Weaver as Joyce Dean (5 episodes)
 Brian Wilde as  Chief Insp. Carter (5 episodes)
 Richard Wilding as  Det. Sgt. Gibbs (3 episodes)
 Michael Collins as George Antrobus (2 episodes)
 Elizabeth Craven as Mrs. Long (2 episodes)
 Sydney Dobson as  Chauffeur (2 episodes)
 Carole Mowlam as Mary Antrobus (2 episodes)
 Ian Norris as Jackson (2 episodes)
 Martin Norton as Peter Antrobus (2 episodes)
 John Marcus Powell as  Man in car park (2 episodes)
 Reg Pritchard as Duncan (2 episodes)
 Petra Davies as  Melissa Foster (1 episode)
 Lennard Pearce as Det. Sgt. Heston (1 episode)
 Anthony Sagar as  George (1 episode)
 Patricia Marmont as Carol Stewart (1 episode)

DVD
The series has been released to DVD in a BBC box set, along with three other titles as Francis Durbridge Presents - Volume 1.

References

Bibliography
Ellen Baskin. Serials on British Television, 1950-1994. Scolar Press, 1996.

External links
 

BBC television dramas
1964 British television series debuts
1964 British television series endings
English-language television shows